Dmitri Andreyevich Pikatov (born 10 August 1996) is a Russian football player who plays for FC Dynamo Bryansk.

Club career
He made his debut in the Russian Football National League for FC Dynamo Bryansk on 8 August 2020 in a game against FC Yenisey Krasnoyarsk, he substituted Aleksandr Kryuchkov in the 69th minute.

References

External links
 
 Profile by Russian Football National League
 

1996 births
Sportspeople from Bryansk
Living people
Russian footballers
Association football midfielders
FC Dynamo Bryansk players